Order to Kill is a 1974 Spanish-Italian crime-action film written and directed by José Gutiérrez Maesso. In the movie the police inspector (José Ferrer) offers passports to a hit man (Helmut Berger) and his girlfriend (Sydne Rome) if the hit man kills a mob boss.

Cast 
 Helmut Berger – Clyde Hart
 Sydne Rome – Anne
 Kevin McCarthy – Ed McLean  
 José Ferrer – Detective Reed  
 José María Caffarel – Richard 
 Howard Ross – Richard 
 Manuel Zarzo – Hugo
 Juan Luis Galiardo
 Álvaro de Luna – Daniel

Production
Eugenio Martín minimized his contributions to the script in the film, stating that itw as "It was Maesso's project, and Moncada and I were to write it. However, there was no way we could come up with a good plot, so we soon called ourselves out. Maesso did not give up, though, and he called and Italian screenwriter to do the job" When the film was finished, Maesso credited both Moncada and Martin for their work on the film, but Martin stated that he probably did not use much of it.

Release
Order to Kill was released in Italy on August 31, 1974. In Italy, the film grossed a total of 360,601,000 lire.

Reception
In his book Italian Crime Filmography 1968–1980, Roberto Curti referred to the film as a "tiresome variation on the classic theme of a lonely man's vengeance, notable mainly for a script that in the second part predates Enzo G Castellari's powerful The Big Racket" and that actor Helmut Berger "is given little to do with the clichéd character".

Notes

References

External links

Order to Kill at Variety Distribution

Poliziotteschi films
Italian crime action films
Spanish crime action films
1970s crime action films
1970s Italian films